Noel Philip Ryan (1912 – 23 November 1969) was an Australian freestyle swimmer who competed in the 1932 Summer Olympics and the 1930 and 1934 British Empire Games. In 1932 he finished fourth in the 1500-metre freestyle.  In the 400-metre freestyle, he was eliminated in the semi-finals and in the 100-metre freestyle event he was eliminated in the first round. Nicknamed "Tiger", Ryan won Australian swimming championships in most of the years between 1928 and 1941, in all winning 16 Australian and 27 New South Wales titles, plus four gold medals at the Empire Games of 1930 and 1934.

References

1912 births
1969 deaths
Australian male freestyle swimmers
Olympic swimmers of Australia
Swimmers at the 1932 Summer Olympics
Swimmers at the 1930 British Empire Games
Swimmers at the 1934 British Empire Games
Swimmers at the 1938 British Empire Games
Commonwealth Games gold medallists for Australia
Commonwealth Games bronze medallists for Australia
Commonwealth Games medallists in swimming
People from Manly, New South Wales
Sport Australia Hall of Fame inductees
20th-century Australian people
Medallists at the 1930 British Empire Games
Medallists at the 1934 British Empire Games
Medallists at the 1938 British Empire Games